Sveinn Jóhannsson (born 16 June 1999) is an Icelandic handball player for GWD Minden and the Icelandic national team.

He represented Iceland at the 2020 European Men's Handball Championship.

References

1999 births
Living people
Sveinn Jóhannsson
SønderjyskE Håndbold players
Expatriate handball players
Icelandic expatriate sportspeople in Denmark